Edward Gower "Ned" Wenman (18 August 1803 – 28 December 1879) was an English first-class cricketer whose career spanned the 1825 to 1854 seasons. A specialist wicket-keeper, he was a prominent member of the great Kent team of the 1840s which also featured Nicholas Felix, William Hillyer, Alfred Mynn and Fuller Pilch. Wenman is generally remembered as one of the greatest wicketkeepers of the 19th century. He came from a cricketing family, other first-class players being his cousins George and John, his son William and his brother Charles. In his first-class career, Wenman made 146 appearances, totalling 3,204 runs with a highest score of 73 not out and taking 45 wickets bowling occasionally with a slow underarm style. He held 118 catches and completed 87 stumpings.

Notes

References

Bibliography
 
 
 
 
 

1803 births
1879 deaths
English cricketers of 1787 to 1825
English cricketers of 1826 to 1863
Kent cricketers
North v South cricketers
Hampshire cricketers
Marylebone Cricket Club cricketers
Married v Single cricketers
Left-Handed v Right-Handed cricketers
Gentlemen cricketers
Cambridge Town Club cricketers
Players cricketers
West of England cricketers
Non-international England cricketers
Gentlemen of Nottinghamshire cricketers
A to K v L to Z cricketers
Fast v Slow cricketers
Gentlemen of Kent cricketers
People from Benenden
Wicket-keepers